Aleksandra Krunić (born 15 March 1993) is an inactive Serbian professional tennis player. She has won one singles title and six doubles titles on the WTA Tour along with one singles title on WTA 125 tournaments. In June 2018, she reached her best singles rankings of world No. 39. On 30 September 2019, she peaked at No. 35 in the doubles rankings. She is the current Serbian No. 1 female player.

Krunić was the runner–up of 2009 Australian Open in girls' doubles, along with Sandra Zaniewska. She made her WTA Tour debut at 2010 Slovenia Open, playing doubles with world No. 2, Jelena Janković, and made her WTA singles debut at the 2011 Budapest Grand Prix. In 2014 US Open, in her second main-draw appearance at a Grand Slam tournament, Krunić won her first main-draw match and then reached the fourth round, beating 27th seed Madison Keys and third seed Petra Kvitová in the process.

Krunić has wins over prime or close to their prime Garbiñe Muguruza, Petra Kvitová, Jeļena Ostapenko, Elina Svitolina, Johanna Konta, CoCo Vandeweghe, Sara Errani, Roberta Vinci, Madison Keys, Ekaterina Makarova and Caroline Garcia. She has wins over former top-10 players, Timea Bacsinszky, while she was coming back from injury, as well as over Kimiko Date and Roberta Vinci in their last career matches, which were played in front of their home crowds in Tokyo and Rome, respectively. She also has wins in the qualifying rounds over former top-5 players Francesca Schiavone and Daniela Hantuchová.

Personal life
Krunić was born to Bratislav and Ivana Krunić and has a sister named Anastasia. She was born on 15 March 1993 in Moscow, Russia. She currently resides in Moscow, Bratislava and Belgrade, and speaks Serbian, Slovak, Russian and English fluently.

Tennis career

Junior events
Krunić picked up a tennis racquet aged seven. She began training tennis at the Spartak Moscow club, which spawned numerous tennis stars such as Anna Kournikova, Elena Dementieva, Marat Safin, Anastasia Myskina, Igor Andreev and others. Since then Krunić has been coached by Edouard Safonov. In 2006, Krunić reached the semifinals of junior Kremlin Cup, losing to Dalia Zafirova. The following year, she won junior events in Podgorica, Livorno and Maia. In 2008, Krunić reached the quarterfinals of European Junior Championships in Moscow and won the junior event in Budapest. She also played at the junior event in Kramfors, however, withdrew from the final match against Croatian Silvia Njirić due to injury by a score of 6–3, 6–1 for Njirić.

In 2009, she played the second round of Australian Open in girls' singles and the final of girls' doubles event, partnering with Sandra Zaniewska. The two lost to Christina McHale and Ajla Tomljanović in the super-tiebreaker. She reached the second round of both girls' singles and doubles at the French Open, and lost in the first round of girls' singles at Wimbledon. Krunić also partnered with Tamara Čurović at the girls' doubles, however they lost in the first round to Tímea Babos and Ajla Tomljanović. In April 2009, she reached her highest junior ranking when she was ranked world No. 17.

Although she had decided not to play juniors anymore, Krunić took part in the European Championships organized by both ITF and Tennis Europe, along with Bojana Jovanovski and Doroteja Erić in the team of Serbia.

2008–2010: Beginning, dominance on ITF Circuit
As a member of TK Red Star, Krunić won the national club championships in 2008. She was awarded with a wildcard for tennis event in Prokuplje, Serbia organized by the ITF. On 6 July 2008, Krunić won the tournament and became the youngest title winner in 2008 by winning this event. She beat one wildcard, third seed, and next three players were qualifiers. In October 2008, she also played two ITF events in Dubrovnik, but lost both times in first round.

Krunić was invited by Serbia Fed Cup team coach Dejan Vraneš to join the team for the 2009 Fed Cup World Group Play-offs versus Spain. Jelena Janković and Ana Ivanovic secured Serbia 4–0 win. Krunić debuted in a doubles match played on 25 April 2009, along with Ana Jovanović, and they were down 6–2, 1–0 against Llagostera Vives and Domínguez Lino, when the match was cancelled due to rain. In 2009, Krunić won a total of three ITF titles, including first in doubles. On 14 September 2009, she was ranked No. 795.

In January 2010, Krunić won her fourth ITF tournament in Quanzhou, China defeating domestic player Zhou Yimiao in the final, after beating top seed and compatriot Bojana Jovanovski in semifinal. In May, she won ITF singles title in Moscow and was the doubles runner–up. Krunić made her WTA Tour debut at the Slovenia Open, playing doubles with world No. 2 and compatriot Janković. The two reached semifinals beating the fourth seeds Eleni Daniilidou and Jasmin Wöhr in process, but then had to withdraw from their semifinal match due to an injury of Janković.

2011–2012: WTA Tour singles debut
In February 2011, Krunić again was invited to play for the Serbia Fed Cup team in the World Group II rubber against Canada. She lost her debut singles match against world No. 84, Rebecca Marino, in three sets. Krunić played the final doubles match with Bojana Jovanovski, beating Fichman and Pelletier to guarantee Serbia the spot in the World Group Play Offs. Serbia won that tie 3–2 against Slovakia, after Krunić and Janković having beaten Hantuchová and Rybáriková in three sets, rallying from 2–6, 1–5. With this win, Serbia qualified for the 2012 Fed Cup World Group.

In May 2011, Krunić qualified for the $100k Sparta Prague Open. She reached the semifinals where she lost to world No. 10, Petra Kvitová, in straight sets. At Wimbledon and the US Open, she lost in qualifying. Krunić qualified for her first WTA singles event in Budapest. She was leading in the first-round match against Nina Bratchikova 7–5, 1–0, when Bratchikova retired. Krunić lost her following match to the third seed Klára Zakopalová. She played in Tashkent, and after qualifications, Krunić won her second WTA professional match, losing just one game to Kamila Farhad. In the second round, she lost to Sorana Cîrstea, in two tight sets.

At the Australian Open, Krunić fell to qualify losing to Lesia Tsurenko in final round. In February 2012, she was a part of Serbian Fed Cup team. She lost in singles to Yanina Wickmayer, but won in doubles with Bojana Jovanovski to claim a historic victory for Serbia. In 2012 on ITF Circuit, Krunić won one title and lost one final in both singles and doubles. At next Grand Slam tournaments, she failed to qualify. In Baku, Krunić reached first WTA main draw of season and finished as a quarterfinalist for the first time. She beat fourth seed Andrea Hlaváčková and in second round Laura Pous Tió, but lost in three sets to eventual champion Bojana Jovanovski.

2013: First major appearance
Krunić started the season playing at the Australian Open qualifying, losing to Maria Elena Camerin in the third set. At WTA events in Bogotá and Acapulco, Krunić did not qualify. In Irapuato, Mexico, Krunić beat Olga Savchuk for her first ITF title of the year and seventh overall, dropping no set the entire tournament. In clay-court season, she played four ITF tournaments and the best result was in Trnava, Slovakia when she reached the semifinal. There she beat top 100 player and top seed Jana Čepelová in first round, but Barbora Záhlavová-Strýcová was better in two sets in semifinal. At French Open she lost in three sets to Mariana Duque Marino in second qualifying round.

After missing Wimbledon, Krunić played in WTA events in Budapest and Baku without qualifying rounds. In Baku, she was the only player who won a set against eventual champion Elina Svitolina. In doubles, Krunić played alongside Eleni Daniilidou and went to first WTA doubles final where they lost in three sets. US Open was the first Grand Slam tournament where she qualified for the main draw – she beat Carina Witthöft, Daria Gavrilova and Louisa Chirico to do it, all in two sets. But in first round, CoCo Vandeweghe was better in two sets. Week after US Open, she played an ITF in Trabzon, Turkey and won her last ITF title of the season, beating Stéphanie Foretz Gacon in the final. At the WTA events in Linz and Luxembourg City, she played qualifications. In Linz, she qualified but lost to lucky loser Maryna Zanevska, in three sets. In doubles, Krunić won three ITF titles and lost in two finals during the season.

2014: Top 100, US Open fourth round and first WTA doubles title
In first round of qualifications at the Australian Open, Krunić lost to Zarina Diyas in three sets. In January, she qualified for the Pattaya Open, but lost to Nicha Lertpitaksinchai in the first round. Next she played three ITF events and best result was quarterfinal where she lost to Timea Bacsinszky. In the WTA event in Katowice, Krunić didn't qualify for main draw, but she beat former top-30 player Tamira Paszek. In Kuala Lumpur, she didn't need qualifications, but in first round, she lost to Karolína Plíšková in two sets. On clay, she made it to the semifinal at two ITF tournaments. At French Open and Wimbledon, she failed to qualify. At the WTA event in Bucharest, she beat Alexandra Panova in the first round, but lost in the second to world No. 3 and domestic player, Simona Halep, in a match full of breaks. Last prepare for US Open was at an ITF event in Poland where she lost in early round of singles, but won doubles title alongside Barbora Krejčíková.

At the US Open, Krunić again qualified for her second main-draw appearance. In the first round, she played against good friend Katarzyna Piter and won her first ever main-draw match at a Grand Slam tournament. In the second round, 27th seed Madison Keys awaited. Although they finished the match with the same number of points, Krunić won in three sets and subsequently defeated third seed and reigning Wimbledon champion, Petra Kvitová in the third round in straight sets. With that win, she was guaranteed a world ranking in the top 100 for the first time. In the round of 16, Krunić lost to 16th seed and two time US Open finalist, Victoria Azarenka, in three sets. 18-time Grand Slam champion Martina Navratilova said of Krunić during the match "what a find she is, what an athlete". During the tournament, Krunić's compatriots Janković, Ivanovic and Jovanovski gave her advice and support. She was nominated a "Rising star of the month", but Belinda Bencic had more votes by 5%. Also, the match against Azarenka was one of ten matches nominated for Grand Slam match of the year award.

The Asian swing started for Krunić in Tashkent. Despite losing to Lesia Tsurenko in the first round of singles, she managed to capture her first WTA title playing doubles alongside Kateřina Siniaková. They beat all opponents in three sets en route to the final, where they beat Margarita Gasparyan and Alexandra Panova, in straight sets. In her hometown Moscow, she beat Caroline Garcia but lost to Tsvetana Pironkova in second round. In doubles, Krunić and Siniakova beat top-seeded top-10 players Makarova and Vesnina in the first round.

2015: Wimbledon third round
 
Before the 2015 season, Krunić won an ITF title in Ankara in late December as a top seed, saving a few match points en route. In Shenzhen, she qualified and then in second round won against Anna Schmiedlová, rallying from 3–6, 2–5 and saving match points. In the quarterfinal, eventual champion Simona Halep was better in straight sets. At the Australian Open, Krunić played her first Grand Slam event without qualifying, and was beaten in first round by Lauren Davis. She beat Schmiedlová in Acapulco again, but lost her next four matches on hardcourt. In Prague on clay, she upset Mirjana Lučić-Baroni, but lost narrowly to Yanina Wickmayer. At the French Open, she lost to Yulia Putintseva.

Krunić started grass-court season playing in Birmingham, where she qualified for main draw and beat Heather Watson in first round, but lost next to Svetlana Kuznetsova. She then had her best result of the year in terms of importance, as she reached the third round of Wimbledon with wins over 19th seed Sara Errani and former world No. 11, Roberta Vinci. She lost to Venus Williams in straight sets.

Krunić returned to clay playing at the Bucharest Open where she reached the quarterfinals. She beat Elizaveta Kulichkova and Roberta Vinci again, losing just two games, but lost to Polona Hercog. However, she didn't win a match at her next six tournaments, including US Open loss to Danka Kovinic. She also played doubles alongside Janković and they reached third round but lost match for quarterfinal against fourth seeds Dellacqua and Shvedova, as they led 6–2, 4–2 and also 4–2 in third set.

She won her first match since six-match losing streak in Tashkent Open, beating Anett Kontaveit but lost to Jovanovski. At the next tournament in Linz, she won five matches to reach her third quarterfinal of the year. She won three qualifying rounds, including wins over Anastasija Sevastova and Kaia Kanepi, to reach the main draw. There she defeated previous month's US Open finalist, Roberta Vinci (for the third time in only five months) and Mona Barthel, before losing to eventual champion Anastasia Pavlyuchenkova. She played at next event in Moscow but lost to Lesia Tsurenko.

Krunić reached a new career-high ranking of No. 62 in July, but finished the year at No. 96.

2021-22: Major doubles quarterfinals, singles third round & Serbian No. 1
Coming back from wrist injury, Krunić qualified for the main draw at 2022 Roland-Garros. She beat Kamilla Rakhimova in the first round in straight sets, before losing in the second round to 29th seed Veronika Kudermetova.

In June, as a lucky loser she entered the main draw of Birmingham Classic, where she managed to beat Petra Martić in straight sets, in the first round, before losing to sixth seed Sorana Cîrstea. The following week, Krunić qualified for the main draw at the Eastbourne International where she lost in the first round, in three tight sets, to Australian Ajla Tomljanović.
At Wimbledon, she met again 26th seed Sorana Cîrstea in the first round and lost in two tiebreak sets.

In July, Krunić beat Laura Siegemund in straight sets in the first round of the Budapest Grand Prix. In the second round she beat sixth seed Zhang Shuai, while in the quarterfinals she defeated Wang Xiyu to reach the semifinals. Next she reached her third WTA singles final defeating third seed and defending champion Yulia Putintseva. In the final, she lost to Bernarda Pera. As a result, she returned to top 100 becoming the Serbian player No. 1.

Her next tournament was the Hamburg European Open where she beat Sabine Lisicki in straight sets, before losing to the fourth seed Aliaksandra Sasnovich in the second round.

At the US Open, she defeated Elina Avanesyan in straight sets in the first round. In the second, she managed to beat 23rd seed and Roland Garros 2021 champion Barbora Krejčíková to reach the third round for a fourth time at this major, before losing to Ludmilla Samsonova. As a result, she moved back into the top 75 in the rankings after several years of absence.

In September, Krunić was the top seed in qualifying for the Tallinn Open. In her first match, she was up 6–4, 5–4 up against Eva Lys and serving for the match, when she torn her knee which resulted in total acl rupture.

Performance timelines

Only main-draw results in WTA Tour, Grand Slam tournaments, Fed Cup/Billie Jean King Cup and Olympic Games are included in win/loss records.

Singles
Current through the 2022 Guadalajara Open.

Doubles
Current through the 2022 US Open.

WTA career finals

Singles: 3 (1 title, 2 runner-ups)

Doubles: 11 (6 titles, 5 runner-ups)

WTA Challenger finals

Singles: 1 (title)

Doubles: 1 (runner-up)

ITF Circuit finals

Singles: 13 (9 titles, 4 runner–ups)

Doubles: 17 (7 titles, 10 runner–ups)

Junior Grand Slam tournament finals

Girls' doubles: 1 (runner-up)

Team competition

Fed Cup/Billie Jean King Cup performances

Singles: 19 (12–7)

Doubles: 17 (12–5)

Record against top 10 players
Against players who have been ranked in the top 10. Active players are in boldface.

Head-to-head record

Wins over top-10 players

Awards
 2007 – Tennis Europe Silver Medal for Player of the Year U–14
 2012 – Serbian Women's Team of The Year (as part of Serbia Fed Cup team)

See also
 Serbia Fed Cup team

Notes

References

External links

 
 
 
 
 
 
 
 Unofficial blog

1993 births
Living people
Tennis players from Moscow
Russian people of Serbian descent
Serbian female tennis players
Serbian people of Russian descent
Olympic tennis players of Serbia
Tennis players at the 2016 Summer Olympics
Tennis players at the 2020 Summer Olympics